Khorram Rud (also Romanized as Khorram Rūd; also known as Khormārūd, Khurmahrūd, and Khurumrud) is a village in Deylaman Rural District, Deylaman District, Siahkal County, Gilan Province, Iran. At the 2006 census, its population was 166, in 41 families.

References 

Populated places in Siahkal County